Dugawan, is a neighbourhood of Lucknow, located north of the Charbagh Railway Station. Its name is a blend of 'Do Gaon', meaning 'Two Villages'.

It was established in the 19th century by the Sheikhs. The Sheikhs were given this piece of land (seven hundred acres) to settle in. This land comprised two villages.

References

Neighbourhoods in Lucknow
History of Lucknow
Awadh